Leighton Buzzard R.F.C is a Rugby Union club based in the English town of Leighton Buzzard in the county of Bedfordshire. They play at Wright's Meadow on Leighton Road, in the Parish of Stanbridge. 
In 2022-23 the 1st XV play in Regional 2 East Midlands - a league at the 6th tier of the English rugby union system and based in the RFU Midlands Division.

History

Early years
The club was founded in 1934 with the enthusiastic support of the town's Cedars Grammar School with which it has always maintained a close support. The club flourished during those early years, playing its home matches at the Cricket Club's Bell Close headquarters, but like many others, was disbanded with the outbreak of World War II. Many of the founder members did not return from the hostilities and probably in consequence the club was not reformed until mid-way through season 1948–49. Several successful seasons followed, with the club supported by local schools and locally based service personnel, but fell into decline and was disbanded at the end of the 1955–56 season. Rugby during this immediate post-war period was played at the Capshill Meadow on the Hockliffe Road which is just big enough for one pitch.

The club of today arguably owes its existence to the enthusiasm of a 19-year-old Howard Ansdell who initiated the reforming of the club in time for the 1958–59 season and to local businessman Geoff Wright who steered the club into erecting its first clubhouse in 1962, and in 1965 to the purchase of the Capshill Meadow ground. Proceeds from the sale of the ground in 1973 established the splendid facilities we now enjoy. The move to Stanbridge Road occurred at a time when the Town was expanding and with many new players available to the club, was able to attract much stronger fixtures for its Senior XV. The transformation of Cedars Grammar to a comprehensive did not stop the flow of good rugby players to the club as rugby remained the primary winter sport at the school. Thanks to Cedars, Leighton was always able to punch above its weight for a club from a relatively small town. Each of the club's six sides would always have a good representation of Old Cedarians.

The slow build (1960s and 1970s)
Admirably fed by a regular intake of players from particularly the Cedars but also the Vandyke Schools, Buzzards grew in stature so that by the 1970s they had a strong fixture list and almost always finished a season with more wins than losses. During this time the club built a strong bond with the club from Leighton Buzzard's French twin town Coulommiers in the Seine-et-Marne department in the Ile de France region. On one memorable occasion the club also stepped in to host top Romanian club CSA Steaua București when bad weather had forced the cancellation of one of their tour matches. At that time Romanian rugby was a force to be reckoned with and if not close to acceptance into the then Five Nations Championship, then they ought to have been as they would score reasonably regular victories over France, Wales and Scotland.

Years of success (1980–1995)
The club's golden period could be traced from the early- to mid-80s through to the mid-90s. Prior to the RFU's implementation of a national league structure, the only measure of success for junior clubs like Leighton were the cup competitions of the RFU constituent county bodies. Winning the County Cup enabled a club to gain entry to the following season's National Knockout Cup and the chance to have a tilt at one of the big clubs. In Leighton Buzzard's case this came in the shape of the East Midlands Cup for clubs based in Bedfordshire and Northants. In 1985–86, Paul Whiting became the first Buzzards skipper to lift the Cup when Peterborough were beaten 16-6 in the final. The draw for the following season's National Cup, then called the John Player Cup, saw them paired with Birmingham, at the time a club on the cusp of first class status who were later to become Birmingham & Solihull R.F.C. Led by David Yirrell, Buzzards produced the upset of the round winning 20–11. Buzzards fell at the next hurdle to Lichfield but with confidence brimming the season culminated with the retention of the East Midlands Cup when Northampton Trinity were beaten 18-8 at Franklin's Gardens.

The following season, the inaugural season of league rugby in England, saw Buzzards placed in Midlands Division 2 (East). They also made their second appearance in the John Player Cup as a result of their County Cup win. Again they conquered higher ranked opposition in the first round when Derby, then of National Division 4 (North), were beaten 10–7 in a close encounter at Leighton Road (the name 'Wright's Meadow' was still to be coined). The second round draw paired them with first class opposition in the form of nearby Bedford Blues, again at home. Led by John Orwin who was to captain England later that season, and also including former and future Buzzard stalwarts in Pete Ellam and John Davidson, Bedford had to work hard to subdue a spirited Buzzards effort. Buzzards conceded just one try in a 24–6 defeat in front of probably the largest crowd to assemble at the ground. Later that season their attempt to land a hat-trick of East Midlands Cup wins was dashed at the last when they fell to Stockwood Park in the final. A fifth place in their first league campaign was a disappointing return for a season that had started with such promise. However this disappointment was tempered slightly by the RFU's decision to expand the entry to the following season's National Cup, now to be called the Pilkington Cup, meaning that Leighton would be included as East Midlands Cup Runners-Up.

In 1988–89 with John Fraser now installed as skipper, the second season of league rugby was a successful one as they finished as champions of Midlands 2 (East) to bring about what became a five-season stay in Midlands Division 1 (now named Regional 1 Midlands).  At the time this was the fifth tier of the National League structure. Their National Cup heroics didn't quite reach their previous heights as they made an 18–12 first round exit to Hereford.

In 1993–94 the club suffered their first relegation dropping back into what was now Midlands Division 2 (the East/West split having been discarded for 1994–95). In terms of silverware the Club now embarked on probably its most successful season. Under the captaincy of Ian Smith, the league title was secured with a win in the last-day winner-takes-all clash against Broadstreet at Wright's Meadow that ensured an immediate return to Midlands Division 1. Not only was there the league success but the Bedfordshire Cup was regained and the East Midlands Cup won for a third (and to date last) time with local rivals Stockwood Park vanquished in both finals.

60th anniversary and beyond
There followed the club's 60th anniversary season which began with celebration matches against Aylesbury, who had been the club's first opponents in 1934, and a side representing top division club Wasps. The East Midlands Cup win of the previous April had also given them another Pilkington Cup excursion. Again they were paired with Birmingham & Solihull. Though this time they had home advantage, history was not to be repeated and their campaign faltered at the first hurdle as they went down 29–11. By now, with the league system having taken deep root very quickly, a club's position within the league structure was now seen as all important with the Pilkington Cup now seen as a diversion, albeit a pleasant one with some kudos if early rounds could be successfully negotiated. Buzzards achieved their primary aim in their first season back in Midlands 1 by consolidating its place with a 10th-place finish in the 13-team table.

The club's most successful league campaign came in the 1997–98 when Carl Siddon led them to a mid-table finish in Midlands Division 1. The following season, however, saw a sharp decline in playing strength and performance and inevitably relegation followed. The club has not been at Level 5 since.

During 2022-2023 the club is fielding two adult senior sides plus a Colts and Ladies XVs.  In recent times the club also fielded three additional senior sides, a Veterans (over 35's) XV. The club relies heavily on developing players from within its own ranks and is very proud of its long-established Mini/Junior section which currently boasts a membership of approximately 200 children aged between 5 and 17 years. Never having had a large benefactor may have meant that Buzzard's senior league position has slipped, but it has meant that the club still belongs to the town and the members and retains the "club feel".  The 1st XV starting line up and subs for the side's last home League match of the successful 2013–14 season contained 11 players whose fathers had also played for the club.

Signs that their star might be in the ascendant once more came in 2006–07 when the Colts XV swept the board winning the East Midlands League and Cup competitions along with the Bedfordshire Cup. The side was captained by Ryan Fraser emulating his father John in lifting silverware in the name of LBRFC.  A majority of those Colts players filtered into the senior setup and kept the club at a good standard.

In March 2020 the club won the Midlands Final of the RFU Intermediate Cup beating Malvern 30-16 at Wright's Meadow despite being reduced to 14 men early in the match.  The draw for the national semi-finals saw them handed a home tie against Halifax-based Old Brodleians who had won the Northern Division final.  Sadly the match was never played owing to the COVID-19 pandemic which saw the eventual cancellation of the competition.  Thus Buzzards, Brodleians and the South West and London Division semi-finalists Wellington and Old Colfeians were left stranded, one step away from a Twickenham final.

Still, from those humble beginnings in 1934 LBRFC now provides a sporting centre with which the town has every right to be proud. However, as an organisation, fully aware that standing still is not an option, the club's committee are actively looking at ways of improving the facilities for the playing of sport and enjoyment of associated social activities.

Honours
1st XV:
East Midlands Cup winners (3): 1985–86, 1986–87, 1994–95
Midlands 2 champions: 1988–89, 1994−95.
Midlands 3 East (north v south) promotion playoff winners: 2007–08
Midlands 2 East (South) champions (2): 2013–14, 2019–20
RFU Midlands Intermediate Cup Winners: 2019–20

2nd XV:

East Midlands Merit Table "Banana Bread League" Champions: 2019–20

4th XV:

East Midlands Merit Table - "Waggledance League" Champions: 2011–12

Colts:
East Midlands Referees Cup (Colts County Cup) winners: 2006−07
East Midlands Colts League champions: 2006−07

Under 17's:
RFU Midlands Plate Winners: 2008−09
RFU National Plate Winners: 2008−09

Notable players
The following players all had top level experience either before or after representing Leighton Buzzard.

Alan Doherty was based at nearby R.A.F. Stanbridge when he turned out for the club on a number of occasions.  After returning to his native Ireland he played for Old Wesley R.F.C. in Dublin.  On 7 September 1974 he earned an international cap when he came on as a replacement for the legendary Mike Gibson in the IRFU Centenary celebration international against the President's XV.  The match was drawn 18-18.

Stuart Maxwell joined following a stint with Bedford having played previously for New Brighton and Richmond. Brother of Andy, who won 7 England caps between 1975 and 1978, Stuart notched up some notable achievements of his own. In 1972 he scored two tries for the North-West Counties in their historic 16–14 win over New Zealand at Workington, the first time an English regional side had beaten the All Blacks. In 1975 having moved on to Bedford, he was a member of the Southern Counties XV that took on Australia during the latter's 1975−76 UK tour.  Here he notched another try against international opposition.  Maxwell was also a Sevens exponent having been a member of the Richmond side that won the Middlesex Sevens in 1974 and 1975.

John Surguy joined the club having completed two spells at Northampton Saints.  Having been a prolific points scorer for Bletchley either side of his first spell at Franklins Gardens, Surguy had lived in Leighton Buzzard throughout and his town club was grateful he eventually made his way there for the 1984-85 season. He featured prominently in the East Midlands Cup wins of 1986 and 1987 and also represented East Midlands in the Mobbs Memorial Match against the Barbarians whilst at Northampton.

Chris Gibbons, though never leaving the Leighton Buzzard club did score the achievement of representing East Midlands on more than one occasion in the annual Mobbs Memorial Match against the Barbarians. At the time it was extremely rare for a player outwith Northampton Saints and Bedford to be invited into the East Midlands side for the match, especially if that player was plying his trade at a junior club. Gibbons was one of the very few to buck the trend.

Pete Ellam spent three seasons with Bedford making 67 1st XV appearances in which he scored 10 tries and a penalty. He eventually returned to Buzzards and was 1st XV captain for 1991–92 season.

John Davidson arrived from Bedford in 1988−89 for the season following the Buzzards v. Bedford John Player Cup clash.  Prior to joining Bedford, Davidson had been a stalwart with Moseley for whom he played in the 1982 John Player Cup Final at Twickenham when they shared the trophy with Gloucester following a 12–12 draw after extra time.  Davidson also represented England 'B'.

George Messum represented England Students whilst studying at Loughborough University.  He also played for Northampton Saints and Bedford before winning a Blue for Oxford University in the 2014 Varsity Match when the Dark Blues scored their record win (43−6) and in doing so notched a fifth consecutive win for the first time in the fixture.  He was elected OURFC captain for the 2015−16 season but was prevented from taking part in Oxford's record sixth consecutive Varsity Match victory owing to amended eligibility rules with relation to degree courses.  He returned to win another Blue in the 2019 match and finally got to skipper Oxford to victory in the 2021 Varsity match played at Welford Road, Leicester.  He played his club rugby for Old Elthamians who during his time there were in National Division 1, tier 3 of the English League setup.

Neil Wise Having moved to Luxembourg with work in the mid-'90s, Wise represented the Luxembourg national side on 20 occasions between 1998 and 2006 scoring 2 tries.  He made his debut against Germany, with his last cap coming against Norway.  His appearance tally included a number of Rugby World Cup qualifiers.

Junior Level representation

Bert Yirrell, a recent 1st XV skipper represented England at Under-16 level when a member of the LBRFC Junior section.

Matthew Barnett-Vincent joined the club as a 16-year-old England age group international hooker and made several appearances for the 1st XV splitting his time with Bedford Blues who he made his 1st team debut against Bedfordshire aged 17 on Boxing Day 1994. Matthew played age group international (up to U21) and club rugby at Bedford for the next few seasons.  He is currently involved in coaching junior players at Buckingham RUFC.

Henry Peck was selected for England Schools whilst at the club.  He now plays for Cambridge in National Division 1, the third tier of the RFU league structure.

Notes

External links
Leighton Buzzard R.F.C. website
LB News website
Leighton Buzzard Observer/Leighton-Linslade Citizen website

English rugby union teams
Rugby clubs established in 1934
Rugby union in Bedfordshire
Leighton Buzzard